Benei Sión, also known as Sabatarios and Cabañistas in Chile, are an ethno-religious group that believe in the Iglesia del Nuevo Pacto (Church of the New Pact). The group originated in Chile where it had by 1994 around 6000 members but is present since the early 1950s in Argentina via chain migration where it had 3000 members by 1994. It has been proposed that the group derives from Crypto-Jews active in colonial Chile. While originating in the Araucanía Region of Chile the group deny to be Mapuche (Araucanian). One leader has been quoted saying "We are Jews and that's how we feel, because we have the same aspirations as the Jewish people".

See also
 Amazonian Jews
 History of the Jews in Chile
 Subbotnik Jews

References

Ethnic groups in Argentina
Ethnic groups in Chile
Groups claiming Jewish descent
Jewish Argentine history
Jewish Chilean history
Jewish Christianity